Gua Musang is a federal constituency in Gua Musang District, Kelantan, Malaysia, that has been represented in the Dewan Rakyat since 1986.

The federal constituency was created in the 1984 redistribution and is mandated to return a single member to the Dewan Rakyat under the first past the post voting system.

This seat was the safe seat held by Tengku Razaleigh Hamzah since the seat's inception in 1986, until he narrowly lost in the 2022 election to Mohd Azizi Abu Naim, representing PAS, with just a margin of 163 votes.

At 8,174 km2, it is the largest parliamentary constituency in Peninsular Malaysia.

Demographics

History

Polling districts 
According to the federal gazette issued on 31 October 2022, the Gua Musang constituency is divided into 46 polling districts.

Representation history

State constituency

Current state assembly members

Local governments

Election results

References

Kelantan federal constituencies